Surfin' U.S.A. is the second album by the American rock band the Beach Boys, released March 25, 1963 on Capitol Records. It reached number 2 in the US during a chart stay of 78 weeks, eventually being certified gold by the RIAA, and brought the group newfound national success. It was led by one single, its title track with the B-side "Shut Down". In the UK, the album was released in late 1965 and reached number 17.

The majority of the album's recording commenced in the first week of 1963, three months after the release of Surfin' Safari. Like the group's debut album, production was credited ostensibly to Capitol's representative for Artists and Repertoire, Nick Venet, although bandleader Brian Wilson was heavily involved in the album's composition. The album marks the beginning of his practice to doubletrack vocals, resulting in a fuller sound.

Background 
In 1990, Brian Wilson reflected on Surfin' U.S.A. in liner notes which accompanied its first CD issue:

Reception

In a retrospective review, Richie Unterberger wrote: "The album as a whole is the best they would make, prior to the late '60s, as a band that played most of their instruments, rather than as a vehicle for Brian Wilson's ideas. The LP was a huge hit, vital to launching surf music as a national craze, and one of the few truly strong records to be recorded by a self-contained American rock band prior to the British Invasion." Author Luis Sanchez summarized the album's impact on culture and the image it established for the Beach Boys:

Track listing

Notes
 Mike Love was not originally credited for any of the tracks on the album. His credits for "Farmer's Daughter", "Noble Surfer", and "Finders Keepers" were awarded after a 1994 court case.
 Some later reissues of the album omit "Stoked" and "Surf Jam".

Charts

References
Citations

Sources

External links

1963 albums
Albums recorded at United Western Recorders
Albums recorded at Capitol Studios
Albums produced by Nick Venet
The Beach Boys albums
Capitol Records albums